Svetlana Andreyevna Ivanova (born 26 September 1985) is a Russian theater and film actress. Her feature film debut was in The 9th Company (2005). Subsequently she starred in such films as Franz + Polina (2006), August Eighth (2011), Friends of Friends (2014), and others. Ivanova received a number of accolades for the role of Polina in Franz + Polina.

Early life 
Ivanova was born in Moscow, Russian SFSR, Soviet Union, into a family of power engineers.

Education 
In 2006, Ivanova graduated from the Gerasimov Institute of Cinematography, where she studied at the Igor Yasulovich's class.

Career
Ivanova made her major debut as Olya in the 2005 film The 9th Company by Fyodor Bondarchuk.

Then, she played the main female role in the film "Franz + Polina" directed by Mikhail Segal. Both  the film and Ivanova as Polina received numerous awards at various film festivals. Ivanova was awarded the Special Jury Prize of the Third International Film Festival "Baltic Debuts", the  "Golden Sword" Prize for Best Actress at the IV International Festival of Military Movies, the Best Actress awards at the 15th Open Film Festival of CIS and Baltic countries Kinoshock, and at the XIV International Festival of Film Actors "Constellation" (Sozvezdie) for the role in this film.

Personal life
In 2006, Ivanova was romantically involved with cinematographer Vyacheslav Lisnevskiy, who later became her common-law husband. In 2012, she gave birth to their daughter, Polina. Since then, the couple has parted. In 2011, she met the film director Dzhanik Fayziyev, her future partner. In February 2018, the news came that she is pregnant with her second child.

Filmography

Films

TV Series

Roles in theater
 "Vermouth" (K. Schlender, diploma)
 "Christmas in the house of Signor Kupello" (E. De Filippo, diploma)
 "When the war is over" (for military prose, diploma)
 "The Power of Darkness" (L. Tolstoy, diploma)
Theater "Sovremennik"
 "Three Comrades" (based on the novel by Erich Maria Remarque) - Patricia Holman
 "Ardent Heart" (A. Ostrovsky) - Paracha
 "Three Sisters" (Anton Chekhov) - Irina

References

External links

 

1985 births
Living people
Russian film actresses
Russian television actresses
Russian stage actresses
21st-century Russian actresses
Actresses from Moscow
Gerasimov Institute of Cinematography alumni